Teknofest, short for  Teknofest Aerospace and Technology Festival, is the largest aviation, aerospace, and technology festival of Turkey initially held at Istanbul Airport in September 2018 by the Turkish Technology Team Foundation (T3) in collaboration with private companies, ministries, and academic institutions. The primary goals of the festival are to raise public awareness about technology in society and to draw attention to the importance of national production.

The Festival is filled with seminars, technology competitions, exhibitions of domestic technology enterprises, Take Off İnternational Startup Summit. Visitors also can enjoy numerous attractions, such as aviation demonstrations including parachuting, air shows of "Solo Turk", "Turkish Stars", and many international aerobatic teams.

Technology competitions are organized in 12 different categories. People of all ages from primary school students to entrepreneurs can take part in the competitions with their projects and also benefit from the technical equipment support.

For the contest "The HackIstanbul 2018 Capture the Flag", organized in cooperation with the European Skills, Competences, Qualifications and Occupations (ECSO) and Romanian Government, computer hackers  from all over the world competed. Winners were awarded money.

Another award-winning competition is the "World Drone Cup" race.

2021 
The festival was planned to be held in Istanbul between September 21-26. The newest competition categories were added to the festival to be held this year in areas such as simulation, artificial intelligence, and unmanned aerial vehicles. Over 5 million TL of material support will be provided to teams who pass the pre-selection stage. Winner teams will receive a total of over 5 million TL in prizes.

Competitions

2020 
The festival was held in 21 different technology categories in Gaziantep on September 17, 2020. Comprehensive competitions that touch every aspect of life from health to agriculture and the environment, covering not only the defense industry but all civilian areas were organized. Biotechnology Innovation Competition, Agricultural Technologies Competition, Environment, and Energy Technologies Competition, Intelligent Transportation Competition, Educational Technology Competition, Helicopter Design Competition, and Jet Engine Design Competition were the competition categories added to the festival. The number of stakeholders also increased to 63 at the festival held in 2020. The festival, which is planned to be held in April, was postponed to September due to the pandemic. Only contestants were able to attend the festival. Approximately 20,000 teams and 100,000 young people from 84 countries applied to participate in the Teknofest competitions.

Competitions

2019 
The festival was held on September 17-22, 2019 at Istanbul Atatürk International Airport. During the Teknofest, 17373 teams participated in the competitions. The total participation in the festival was recorded as 1 million 750 thousand people with competitors and visitors. Turkey's first flying car prototype "Cezeri" was exhibited for the first time. Russian Sukhoi Su-35 fighter jet taxi and Medium-haul passenger plane MC-21 were also shown at the festival. Oher showcased jets were the multi-purpose fighter jet Su-35, Su-57 fighter jet, the latest generation Russian stealth aircraft, and the multipurpose amphibious Beriev Be-200. Unlike 2018, many new events were organized this year thanks to the festival’s huge success such as Flying Car Design Competition, Mini Jet Radial Compressor Design Competition, Turbo Fan Engine Design Competition, robotic competitions, Istanbul International Debate Fair, and TÜBİTAK University Students Research Project Competitions.

Competitions

2018 
At the festival, 14 different technology competitions were held at the Istanbul Airport on September 20-23. About 80,000 people registered for the festival in the first year. Within the scope of the festival, leading Turkish defense and technology institutions and organizations such as Aselsan, Baykar, İGA, Isbak, Roketsan, TUSAŞ, Turkish Airlines, TÜBİTAK and TÜRKSAT organized competitions in different categories. F-16 Solo Türk, Challenger 605, Aston Martin The New Vantage, Tesla P100DL, Lotus Evora 430 GT, Redbull Racing F1, Kawasaki H2R races were also organized. During the festival, Rocket competition in Konya Salt Lake, Vertical Wind Tunnel Program in Taksim Square, Travel Hackathon, Hack Istanbul 2018, World Drone Cup, Take-Off International Startup Summit.

Competitions

Attendance 
In 2018, the first year of Teknofest, 4,333 teams made applications. In 2019, 10,288 teams applied to Teknofest, which has become the world's largest aviation and space festival. It received 1,720,000 participants in total. Despite the epidemic in 2020, a significant increase was observed in the number of applications with 16,034 teams. Applications received in 2021 broke a new record with a total of 36,984 teams. 

There were 12 different competition categories in the festival held in 2018. In the first year of the festival, around 80,000 people registered and welcomed 500,000 visitors. In 2019, more than 50,000 contestants from 122 countries participated in the festival in 19 different categories. The festival was not open to visitors in 2020 due to Covid-19. Despite this, it received applications from more than 100,000 people in 23 categories. In 2021, the number of competition categories was increased to 34.

References 

Festivals established in 2018
Festivals in Istanbul
2018 establishments in Turkey
Science and technology in Turkey
Science festivals
Technology conventions
Aviation in Turkey
Parachuting in Turkey
Air shows
Hacker conventions
Robotics events